Chitgar Lake ( Daryâče-ye Čitgar) is an artificial and recreational lake located to the north of Chitgar Park in northwestern Tehran, Iran.

Officially known as the Lake of the Martyrs of the Persian Gulf, the complex has a total area of around 250 hectares; 130 hectares across the lake and 120 hectares on its coastal zone and resorts.

About 80% of the body of water comes from Kan Creek, and the remaining 20% comes from central areas and surface runoffs of the district.

Chitgar Lake benefits from the seasonal rains and temporary water of the Kan Creek and the running water of Tehran and can help in moderating the weather in the capital.
This lake with an area of about 355 hectares and a capacity of 35 million cubic meters of water is included in the master plan and the detailed plan approved for the 22nd region. Also, as a large expanse of water, this lake can irrigate the underground aquifers of Tehran. A city whose aquifers are slowly draining can prevent the possibility of soil subsidence by implementing this huge project.

This artificial lake, which is a source of moderating the air in the west of Tehran, next to the Chitgar Forest Park, can have very favorable effects in reducing air pollution.
Due to the complex and heterogeneous texture and the increasing population density, the city of Tehran is faced with an increase in pollution exceeding international standards. In this regard, because of the seasonal winds blowing from the west to the east, the pristine and untouched environment of northwest Tehran has always attracted the attention of the authorities.

Chitgar Park, with an area of ​​approximately 950 hectares, has long been the center of attraction for the residents of Tehran to spend their free time, but due to the lack of suitable recreational uses and security of use, their permanent use has not been possible.
In addition, the lake as a water body feeding the underground aquifers and a source of fresh air in the west of Tehran, on one hand and in combination with the Chitgar Forest Park with tourism performance at the extra-regional level of Tehran city on the other hand, it will have potentials that can be investigated in the return of investment.

History

In 1968, within the first master plan of the city of Tehran, it was planned to construct a lake in western Tehran. But due to technical and budgetary constraints, the construction of the lake remained dormant for many years.

From 2003 to 2010, some detailed studies were accomplished and the uncertainties of the plan were reviewed. Eventually, the construction of the lake area began in September 2010.

The project was conducted by the company of Sabir (related to the Ministry of Energy), based on the design and studies provided by the company of Pars Tunnel (Stucky Pars Consulting Engineers).

The design of the lakeshore was based on the studies and research provided by Emco Iran Consulting Engineers. 

The Lakeshore Landscape Design of the Chitgar lake was done by Mohsen Khorasanizadeh, Morteza Adib & Maryam Yousefi.

Gallery

References

Lakes in Tehran
Lakes of Iran
Landforms of Tehran Province
Artificial lakes